Mana Neyestani (born 29 May 1973) is an Iranian cartoonist, illustrator, and comic book creator. His work appears internationally in economic, intellectual, political and cultural magazines. He is particularly known for his work for reformist papers in Iran and Persian language websites Radio Zamaneh, Tavaana: E-Learning Institute for Iranian Civil Society, and IranWire. He is also well-known because of his cartoons about Iranian presidential election, 2009. 
He is the 2010 recipient of the Cartoonists Rights Network International Award for Courage in Editorial Cartooning. He lives in France.

Early life
Mana was born in Tehran, to an Iranian Azerbaijani family. His father Manouchehr Neyestani (1936 - 1981) was a well-known Iranian poet from Kerman and his mother is from Tehran. Touka Neyestani a fellow cartoonist as well is Mana's older brother. Mana has a master's degree in Architecture from the University of Tehran.

Career
Mana began his professional cartooning career in 1989, and started drawing editorial cartoons in 1998, for Zan. During 1998-2000, he drew a large number of cartoons for various reformist newspapers, such as Asr-e Azadegan, Sobhe Emrooz, Mosharekat, Azad, Neshat (as a freelancer), and Aftab-e Emrooz (as a staff cartoonist). Mana also did many illustrations  for kids magazines during his career including Doost magazine. He was in charge of the kids section of the nationwide published newspaper Iran for many years. His cartoons are published regularly on the website of Iranian exile media Radio Zamaneh, as well as Tavaana: E-Learning Institute for Iranian Civil Society and IranWire.

Books
Mana Neyestani has authored several books, mostly graphic novels. The Adventures of Mr Ka is his most famous comic book series, and consists of four books, all in Persian. Other books include:

 Kaboos ("Nightmare") was published in Iran in 2000
 Khaneh Ashbah ("The House of Ghosts") was published in Iran in 2001, and after it was banned in Iran, it was republished in the United States in 2014
 Puzzle Asheghaneh Aghai-e Ka ("The Love Puzzle of Mr Ka") was published in Iran in 2004, and after it was banned in Iran, it was republished in the United States in 2014
 Hogopsi was published in the United States in 2013
 An Iranian Metamorphosis (2014) is his autobiographical graphic novel. It was originally published in French, and later was published in German, Spanish and English.

Controversy

Riots erupted by ethnic Azerbaijanis in Iran when they took offense to a Neyestani cartoon published in the children's section of the 12 May 2006 supplement of Iran, a government-run newspaper. The cartoon depicted a cockroach responding in Azerbaijani. Neyestani, along with Mehrdad Ghasemfar, the editor-in-chief of Iran, were arrested by government officials and the newspaper was closed down following the riots.

Neyestani and the editor of the paper ended up in solitary confinement in Tehran's Evin prison under conditions the cartoonist described as "Kafkaesque." Three months later, Neyestani was given a temporary prison leave and used it to flee the country with his wife. He finally ended up in exile in France where he published a graphic novel titled An Iranian Metamorphosis, about his time in prison.

He clarified the use of the word that was interpreted as from the Azerbaijani language as slang in the Persian language and that he did not want to offend anyone with his cartoon.

Awards 
 Award for courage in editorial cartooning (presented by Cartoonists Rights Network International), 2010 
 2nd award of housing in Tehran (1999)
 2nd award of Atomic Bomb cartoon contest of Golagha magazine (1999)
 Diploma of honor of football international cartoon contest in Iran (1999)
 Diploma of honor of 4th biennial international cartoon in Iran (1999)
 Selected in section final of comic strip in Umoristi a Marostica in Italy (1999)
 First award of the press festival in cartoon in Iran (1999)
 2nd award of blue-sky contest in Tehran (1998)
 4th award of blue-sky contest in Tehran (1997)

References

External links
 Mana Neyestani's books on Amazon
 Mana Neyestani's cartoons for Tavaana: E-Learning Institute for Iranian Civil Society
 Mana Neyestani's cartoons for IranWire
 A comic strip by Mana Neyestani
 About Mana's Father
 Mana's biography and Picture

Iranian cartoonists
Iranian comics artists
Iranian caricaturists
University of Tehran alumni
People from Tehran
Living people
1973 births
Iranian Azerbaijanis
Iranian expatriates in France
Controversies in Iran